The 2013 AFL women's draft was the inaugural national women's draft organised by the Australian Football League, held to select Melbourne and Western Bulldogs players for the Hampson-Hardeman Cup, an exhibition match.  It was conducted on 15 May and consisted of 50 picks, with the odd-numbered picks selected by Melbourne, and the even-numbered picks selected by the Bulldogs. The order was decided by a coin toss on the night. Darebin Falcons player Daisy Pearce was selected by Melbourne with the first pick. Darebin provided the most players in the draft, with 10 selected.

Draft

References

AFL women's draft
ADL women's draft
AFL women's draft
AFL women's draft
2010s in Melbourne
Australian rules football in Victoria (Australia)
Sport in Melbourne
Events in Melbourne